The Citra Award for Best Picture (Indonesian: Film Cerita Panjang Terbaik) is an award given at the Indonesian Film Festival (FFI) to the best feature film of the year. The Citra Awards, described by Screen International as "Indonesia's equivalent to the Oscars", are the country's most prestigious film awards and are intended to recognize achievements in films as well as to draw public interest to the film industry.

Before, Now & Then by Kamila Andini is the most recent winner at the 2022 ceremony, where it won a total of 5 awards out of 11 nominations.

History 
The Citra Awards, then known as the Indonesian Film Festival Awards, were first given in 1955 to co-winners Usmar Ismail's Lewat Djam Malam and Lilik Sudjio's Tarmina. The two-way tie, also found in the Best Actor and Best Actress categories, was controversial as film critics considered Lewat Djam Malam the superior film, leading to allegations that producer Djamaluddin Malik had bought Tarmina prize. Succeeding festivals were held in 1960 and 1967 and annually since 1973. There were no Citra Awards given between 1993 and 2003 due to sharp decline in domestic film production. It was reinstated as an annual event in 2004 after receiving funds from the Indonesian government.

The Best Picture category is considered the most important Citra Award at the Indonesian Film Festival. It is often regarded as the domestic film industry's standard of the year's best motion picture, which takes into account the overall production of a film, including the directing, performances, scoring, writing, music, sound mixing, cinematography, art direction, and editing.

Marlina the Murderer in Four Acts won Best Picture in 2018 with an overall 10 awards out of 15 nominations, garnering the most wins and most nominations of all time. Prior to that, both records were held by 1986 Best Picture winner Mother with an overall 9 awards out of 10 nominations. The record for most nominations was later broken by 2020 Best Picture winner Impetigore with 17 nominations.

Upon winning in 2007, Nagabonar Jadi 2 became the first, and as of 2020 the only, sequel to have won Best Picture. Its first film Nagabonar also won Best Picture twenty years prior in 1987.

In 1967, 1977, and 1984, no Best Picture awards were given. In 1967 and 1977, the decision was made because the jury found the films in contention to be underwhelming, meanwhile in 1984 the decision was caused by an error made by the organizing committee who mishandled the envelope containing the jury's Best Picture winner selection. In 1980, Arifin C. Noer's Yuyun in the Mental Hospital, licensed as a documentary film, was nominated for Best Picture, a decision that was scrutinized by film critics at the time.

The award has been revoked once, in 2007, following strong criticisms from other filmmakers over 2006 Best Picture winner Ekskul's unauthorized use of copyrighted materials from the 2000 film Gladiator and the 2005 film Munich.

Winners and nominees
Winners are highlighted in blue and listed in bold.

1950s

1960s

1970s

1980s

1990s

2000s

2010s

2020s

Explanatory notes

See also 
 Cinema of Indonesia
 Indonesian Film Festival
 Citra Award for Best Director
 Citra Award for Best Actor
 Citra Award for Best Actress
 Citra Award for Best Supporting Actor
 Citra Award for Best Supporting Actress
 Maya Awards

References



Awards for best film
Citra Awards
Indonesian awards